Sarah Jean Jamieson (born 5 May 1994) is a field hockey player from Scotland, who plays as a forward.

Personal life
Sarah Jamieson was born and raised in Edinburgh, Scotland. She works as a solicitor.

Career

Senior team
Sarah Jamieson made her senior international debut for Scotland in 2014, during a test series against Spain in Alicante.

She has represented her native country at two Commonwealth Games. Her first was the XXI Games on the Gold Coast, followed by the XXII Games in Birmingham.

References

External links

Sarah Jamieson in 2018 Commonwealth Games

1994 births
Living people
Scottish female field hockey players
Female field hockey forwards
21st-century Scottish women
Alumni of the University of Dundee
Field hockey players at the 2018 Commonwealth Games
Field hockey players at the 2022 Commonwealth Games